Puma is the only inhabited village of the island of Teanu, in the Vanikoro group located in the Solomon Islands.

The language spoken there has been sometimes referred to as Puma (or wrongly Buma), and is now known as Teanu.

References

External links
 Maps of Vanikoro, showing location of Puma on Teanu island.
 Satellite photo of Puma village.

Populated places in Temotu Province